Le Poisson noyé is a 2008 film.

Synopsis
This fable tells of an old fishmonger who dies and resuscitates several times. The man is a despicable character and his resurrections gives rise to general curiosity. But superstition soon takes over in the villagers’ hearts, they believe nature should reclaim its rights.

Awards
 Beirut International Film Festival 2008
 FESPACO 2009

External links

2008 films
Tunisian short films